Captain Cook Bridge may refer to:
 Captain Cook Bridge, Brisbane
 Captain Cook Bridge, Sydney